Samvel Grigorievich Kocharyants (born 7 January 1909 in Gavar, Russian Empire, died 4 August 1993 in Sarov, Russia) was a Soviet Armenian designer and developer of the first Soviet nuclear warheads for ballistic missiles. He was awarded Hero of Socialist Labor twice.

References

1909 births
1993 deaths
Armenian inventors
Armenian nuclear physicists
Russian nuclear physicists
Soviet nuclear physicists
Soviet Armenians